The first USS Wathena (ID-3884) was a United States Navy cargo ship in commission in 1919.

Wathena was a steel-hulled, single-screw freighter built for the United States Shipping Board in 1918 at Bristol, Pennsylvania, by the Merchant Shipbuilding Corporation. She was taken over by the U.S. Navy on 1 February 1919 for operation by the Naval Overseas Transportation Service (NOTS). Assigned Identification Number (Id. No.) 3884, she was placed in commission at Philadelphia, Pennsylvania, on the same day.

Wathena conducted only one round-trip voyage for NOTS. Her holds loaded with 5,754 tons of cargo, she departed Philadelphia on 13 February 1919, bound for the British Isles. After arriving at London, England, on 1 March 1919, she discharged her cargo in the ensuing days, underwent voyage repairs, and departed on 17 March 1919 to return to the United States.

Wathena arrived back at Philadelphia on 3 April 1919 and was placed in line for demobilization soon thereafter. Decommissioned and struck from the Navy List on 10 April 1919, Wathena was simultaneously turned over to the United States Shipping Board.

Wathena remained in the ownership of the Shipping Board through the 1920s. Eventually laid up, she deteriorated so much that she was abandoned in 1933 due to "age and deterioration."

References

External links
 Photo gallery at navsource.org

 

Design 1025 ships of the United States Navy
Ships built in Pennsylvania
1918 ships
World War I cargo ships of the United States
World War I auxiliary ships of the United States
Design 1025 ships